Jonathan Olley (London, United Kingdom, 1967.) is a British photographer. His art Photography focuses on landscapes marked by signs of human Folly, but he has also worked as a war reporter and stills photographer for the motion picture industry.

Early life and education
Olley was born in London.

After being ejected from the Chelsea College of Arts, he attended the post-graduate course at the [https://www.southwales.ac.uk/courses/ma-documentary-photography// University of Wales Newport School of Documentary Photography.]

Early career
In 1989, he began work as a freelance press photographer. In 1990, he won the Nikon Press Award for a photo essay in The Independent newspaper. Between 1991 and 1993, he covered stories on the collapse of the Berlin wall and the 'Velvet Revolution' in Czechoslovakia for the UK press. At the end of 1993 he relocated from London to New York. In 1992, he joined London-based Network Photographers and continued to work freelance, beginning a project in New Mexico and Nevada, USA, on the Atomic Bomb.

The Siege of Sarajevo
In 1994, Olley travelled to Bosnia to live under siege in Sarajevo, taking news photographs for the Boston Globe, Paris Match, L'Express and The Guardian newspaper. On 5 February 1994, he was caught up in what became known as the market massacre in Sarajevo where 68 people were killed and 200 wounded. Olley's images of the market massacre were exhibited at Visa pour l'Image in Perpignan, France in 1994, and his photo essay on Sarajevo won him the Observer Hodge Award as Young Photojournalist of the Year in 1995.

Photo essays and personal projects
Upon receiving a bursary to complete his Atom Bomb project, Olley travelled to Japan to complete the project in Hiroshima and Nagasaki. The A-bomb exhibition opened at The Photographers' Gallery, London.

In 1996, he began another personal project on the Newbury Bypass road protests in the forests of Berkshire for inclusion in a group work for the Millennium.

In the 1997 World Press Photo Awards he won two first prizes. Awarded 'first prize stories: Nature & Environment’, for the essay on the Newbury Bypass road protest and ‘first prize stories: Arts’, for his essay on the Burning Man festival in Nevada. In the same year, he undertook a project for an exhibition to celebrate 50 years of the National Health Service (NHS). This work was widely published in Britain and Europe and exhibited in over 50 NHS hospitals in the UK.

At this point, Olley began work on a 5x4 landscape project on barracks and police stations in Northern Ireland.

Modern Castles of Northern Ireland

Completed in 1989, Olley's 'Modern Castles of Northern Ireland' captures the architecture of The Troubles of Northern Ireland; fortified police stations, watchtowers and army barracks.

Originally published in Source Magazine, this work became widely published around the world and was first exhibited at Festival International Du Reportage, Perpignan, France. It would later be shown at the ICA (London, UK), the Letterkenny Arts Centre, (Co.Donegal, Rep.Ireland) and the Noorderlicht Photofestival (Groningen, Netherlands). In 2003 it was collected for the nation by the Public Record Office and the Imperial War Museum. It was shown at Tate Modern in London in 2010 as part of Exposed: Voyeurism, Surveillance and the Camera. It was published as a book by Factotum in 2007.

Kosovo
In 1999, Olley travelled to Macedonia during the refugee crisis and continued work in Kosovo after the liberation. The resultant book, Kosovo was published by Network Photographers and the 'Partners'. The book was sold to make money for The International Red Cross and featured the work of Sebastião Salgado, Olley and Joachim Ladeofoged. In 2000 the book won the D&AD (Design & Art Directors) Award for Olley's photography.

Later work
During the 2000s Olley worked on a variety of projects. These included the colour large format landscape project 'Between Home & Heaven' on the uninhabited volcanic Island of Surtsey, Iceland, 'Fairy Stones', an examination of myth and superstition and its effects upon modern Icelandic society and 'Engineering Nature', about humankind's desire to create an 'Edenic' landscape, taking into account land use management, reclamation, leisure use of the landscape and car culture.

In 2004, he travelled to Iraq, to continue a project seeking to create visual art that conceptualises the relationships between the human and natural worlds.

Now based in London, he teaches part-time on the Documentary Photography course at the University of Wales, Newport, but remains a freelance photographer, undertaking various assignments around the world.

The Forbidden Forest
‘The Forbidden Forest' looks at the peripheral effects of warfare on the landscape. 'The Forbidden Forest' was exhibited alongside 'Castles of Ulster' at Diemar/Noble Photography, London, in 2009.

Movie stills photography
He worked as stills photographer on the films Green Zone, United 93, The Hurt Locker and Zero Dark Thirty.

References

External links

1967 births
Photographers from London
Living people
Movie stills photographers
Photographers from New York City
British emigrants to the United States